The Catholic Diocese of Machakos is a diocese located in the Town of Machakos in the Ecclesiastical province of Nairobi in Kenya.

History
 May 29, 1969: Established as Diocese of Machakos from Metropolitan Archdiocese of Nairobi

Leadership
 Bishops of Machakos (Latin Church)
 Raphael S. Ndingi Mwana a'Nzeki (29 May 1969  – 30 Aug 1971), appointed Bishop of Nakuru; future Archbishop
 Urbanus Joseph Kioko (9 Jul 1973  – 15 Mar 2003)
 Boniface Lele (Apostolic Administrator 24 Jan 2003  – 15 Mar 2003); future Archbishop
 Martin Kivuva Musonde (15 Mar 2003 - 2015.02), appointed Archbishop of Mombasa on 9 Dec 2014
 Anthony Muheria  (Apostolic Administrator 2015.02 - 25 Aug 2018), appointed Archbishop of Nyeri on 23 Apr 2017
 Norman King'oo Wambua  (23 Jun 2018 -)

See also
Roman Catholicism in Kenya

Sources
 
 GCatholic.org
 Catholic Hierarchy

Roman Catholic dioceses in Kenya
Christian organizations established in 1969
Roman Catholic dioceses and prelatures established in the 20th century
Roman Catholic Ecclesiastical Province of Nairobi